The Carpathian montane conifer forests, also known as Carpathian montane forests, is a temperate coniferous forests ecoregion in the Carpathian Mountains of the Czech Republic, Poland, Slovakia, Ukraine, and Romania.

Geography
The ecoregion covers an area of 125,337 km². It is surrounded by temperate broadleaf and mixed forests ecoregions in the neighboring lowlands. The Central European mixed forests lie to the north, east, and southeast. The Pannonian mixed forests occupy the Pannonian plain and Transylvania to the west and southwest. The Apuseni Mountains in Transylvania form an outlier. The Balkan mixed forests share a small border to the south, in western Wallachia.

Flora
The plant communities in the Carpathians occur in elevational zones, with some variation from range to range, and from north to south.

Foothill forests below 600–650 meters elevation are mostly of broadleaf deciduous trees, principally English oak (Quercus robur), small-leafed lime (Tilia cordata), and European hornbeam (Carpinus betulus) in the northern portion of the range, and oaks – Quercus sessilis, Quercus cerris, Quercus pubescens, and Quercus frainetto – in the southern portion of the range.

Montane forests occur between 600 and 1100 meters elevation in the northern range, and between 650 and 1450 m in the south. 
European beech (Fagus sylvatica) and silver fir (Abies alba) are the characteristic trees, along with Norway spruce (Picea abies) and sycamore maple (Acer pseudoplatanus). Nearly pure stands of European beech occur in some ranges, including the White Carpathians and Little Carpathians in the western Carpathians, the Vihorlat, Bukovec, and Biesczady mountains in the Eastern Carpathians, and areas of the southern Carpathians. In other areas the conifers silver fir and Norway spruce are predominant, including the Tatra Mountains, Moravian-Silesian Beskids, and Orava Magura in the western Carpathians and the Gorgany and Bistrița Mountains in the eastern Carpathians.

The subalpine zone, between 1100 and 1400 meters elevation in the north and 1400 and 1900 meters in the south, is dominated by Norway spruce, with lesser numbers of rowan (Sorbus aucuparia). At the timberline (1400 meters elevation in the north and 1900 meters in the south) arolla pine (Pinus cembra) predominates. In the Tatras the timberline forests are a mix of arolla pines and European larch (Larix decidua). Krummholtz grows above the timberline, with mountain pine (Pinus mugo), dwarf juniper (Juniperus communis subsp. alpina), and green alder (Alnus alnobetula subsp. fruticosa). Above the krummholtz are alpine meadows. In the Bieszczady Mountains there is no Norway spruce zone, and dwarfed beeches transition directly to alpine meadows above 1200 meters elevation. The highest peaks are rocky, with some sparse alpine plants and lichens.

Fauna
The Carpathian montane forests are one of the most sizable refuges in Central Europe for large predators and raptors, including  brown bear (Ursus arctos), wolf (Canis lupus), Eurasian lynx (Lynx lynx), European wildcat (Felis silvestris), and golden eagle (Aquila chrysaetos). The Tatra chamois (Rupicapra rupicapra tatrica) is a subspecies of goat-antelope endemic to the Tatra Mountains. Small populations of European bison (Bison bonasus) range free in the Carpathians. Other large herbivores include red deer (Cervus elaphus hippelaphus) and roe deer (Capreolus capreolus).

Protected areas
A 2017 assessment found that 29,488 km², or 24%, of the ecoregion is in protected areas. Protected areas include Low Tatras National Park, Muránska planina National Park, Veľká Fatra National Park, and Poloniny National Park in Slovakia, Bieszczady National Park in Poland, Carpathian National Nature Park, Carpathian Biosphere Reserve, Cheremosh National Nature Park, Gorgany Nature Reserve, Skole Beskids National Nature Park, Synevyr National Nature Park, and Uzhanian National Nature Park in Ukraine, and Maramureș Mountains Natural Park, Rodna National Park, Călimani National Park, Grădiștea Muncelului-Cioclovina Natural Park, and Apuseni Natural Park in Romania.

The Ancient and Primeval Beech Forests of the Carpathians and Other Regions of Europe is a UNESCO-designated World Heritage Site that includes several old-growth beech forests in the Carpathians, along with beech forests in other parts of Europe.

External links

References

Ecoregions of the Czech Republic
Ecoregions of Poland
Ecoregions of Romania
Ecoregions of Slovakia
Ecoregions of Ukraine
Palearctic ecoregions
Temperate coniferous forests
Montane forests
Carpathians